The complete filmography of silent serial star Pearl White 1910–24.

1910
His Yankee Girl (Short)
The Missing Bridegroom (Short) as Clarice Moulton
The Horse Shoer's Girl (Short)
The Burlesque Queen (Short)
The Matinee Idol (Short) as Helen Durand
The Music Teacher (Short) as Louise Faber
A Woman's Wit (Short) as Grace Brown
The Sheriff and Miss Jones (Short) as Mary Noyes
The New Magdalene (Short) as Mercy Merrick
The Woman Hater (Short)
When the World Sleeps (Short) as Mrs. Madison

1911

Monte Cristo (Short) as Mercedes
An Unforeseen Complication (Short) as The Professor's Daughter
Home Sweet Home (Short) as Mary Lanon
Helping Him Out (Short) as Pearl
The Angel of the Slums (Short) as The Angel of the Slums
The Heart of an Indian Maid (Short) as Indian Maid
The Society Girl and the Gypsy (Short) as Grace
The Stepsisters (Short) as The Stepmother's Spoiled Daughter
His Birthday (Short) as Mrs. Grey - the Wife
Memories of the Past (Short)
The Flaming Arrows (Short)
The Message of the Arrow (Short)
Through the Window (Short)
A Prisoner of the Mohicans (Short)
The Squaw's Mistaken Love (Short) as Pearl
For Massa's Sake (Short)
Love Molds Labor (Short) as Margaret Fuller - the Foreman's Sweetheart
The Terms of the Will (Short)
The Power of Love (Short) as Margaret Fuller - the Foreman's Sweetheart
Love's Renunciation (Short)
Western Postemistress (Short) as The Western Postmistress
The Reporter (Short) as Alice Wayne
The Lost Necklace (Short) as The Sleepwalking Heroine
The Fatal Portrait (Short) as Madeleine
The Doll (Short) as The Wife

1912

The Life of Buffalo Bill (Short)
For the Honor of the Name (Short)
The Arrowmaker's Daughter (Short) as The Arrowmaker's Daughter
The Hand of Destiny (Short) as Señora Martinez - the Wife
The Man from the North Pole (Short)
The Girl in the Next Room (Short) as Alice Brady
Naughty Marietta (Short) as Marietta
McGuirk, the Sleuth (Short) as Byrdie May
Her Dressmaker's Bills (Short) as Mrs. Owing
The Only Woman in Town (Short) as The Widow Chase
Bella's Beaus (Short) as Bella
The Blonde Lady (Short) as Mabel
A Pair of Fools (Short) as Pearl
Oh, Such a Night! (Short) as Pearl
The Gypsy Flirt (Short) as Mabel
The Chorus Girl (Short) as The Wife aka The Chorus Girl
Her Old Love (Short) as Irene
The Valet and the Maid (Short) as The Maid
The Quarrel (Short) as Mrs. Lovey
Locked Out (Short) as Mrs. Happy
The Spendthrift's Reform (Short) as Mrs. Dan Steele
A Tangled Marriage (Short) as Pearl
The Mind Cure (Short) as Pearl
Oh! That Lemonade (Short) as The Widow
His Wife's Stratagem (Short) as Pearl
Her Visitor (Short) as Pearl Burnham
The Mad Lover (Short) as Ethel Marion

1913

Her Kid Sister (Short) as Pearl
Heroic Harold (Short) as Pearl
A Night at the Club (Short) as Mrs. Boredman
The Fake Gas-Man (Short) as Bridget the Maid
A Dip Into Society (Short) as Maggie the Maid
The False Alarm (Short) as Minor Role
Pearl's Admirers (Short) as Pearl
With Her Rival's Help (Short) as Nellie
Box and Cox (Short) as Tillie - the Housemaid
Her Lady Friend (Short) as Miss Alden
Accident Insurance (Short) as Pearl
Strictly Business (Short) as Pearl
An Awful Scene (Short)
That Other Girl (Short) as Pearl
Schultz's Lottery Ticket (Short) as Mrs. Schultz
An Innocent Bridegroom (Short) as The Widow Keene
A Night in the Town (Short) as Nellie Thomas - the Housemaid
Ma and the Boys (Short) as Violet
Knights and Ladies (Short) as Pearl
Who Is the Goat? (Short) as Pearl Sweet
Calicowani (Short) as Mrs. Blake
Lovers Three (Short) as Pearl
His Twin Brother (Short) as Dolly
The Drummer's Note Book (Short) as Pearl
Pearl as a Clairvoyant (Short) as Pearl
The Veiled Lady (Short) as Pearl
Our Parents-In-Law (Short) as Carrie
Two Lunatics (Short) as Pearl
His Romantic Wife (Short) as Mrs. Cool
Forgetful Flossie (Short) as Forgetful Flossie
A Joke on the Sheriff (Short) as The Widow Floss
When Love Is Young (Short) as Pearl
Pearl as a Detective (Short) as Pearl
Oh, Whiskers! (Short) as Miss Hegg
His Awful Daughter (Short) as Nellie
Our Willie (Short) as Willie's Ma
Homlock Shermes (Short) as Pearl - the Girl Detective
Toodelums (Short) as Pearl
A Supper for Three (Short)
Where Charity Begins (Short) as Helen Morris
Hooked (Short) as Mrs. Short
Clancy, the Model (Short)
Mary's Romance (Short) as Mary
The New Typist (Short) as Pearl - the Office Stenographer
False Love and True (Short) as Grace Roberts
Her Joke on Belmont (Short) as The Doctor's Sister
A Call from Home (Short)
Will Power (Short) as Pearl
The Smuggled Laces (Short)
Out of the Past (Short) as Rose Vale - the Country Girl
Who Is in the Box? (Short) as Pearl
An Hour of Terror (Short) as Mrs. Brown
The Girl Reporter (Short) as Pearl White - the Girl Reporter
Muchly Engaged (Short)
True Rivalry (Short) as Georgia Allison
Pearl's Dilemma (Short) as Pearl Howell, a Young Matron
The Hall-Room Girls (Short) as Pearl
The Broken Spell (Short) as Valerie Monroe
College Chums (Short) as Pearl
The Paper Doll (Short) as Alice Wilson
What Papa Got (Short) as Pearl
A Child's Influence (Short)
Starving for Love (Short) as Mabel
Oh! You Scotch Lassie (Short) as Pearl 
How Women Love (Short) as Alice Howard
Pearl and the Tramp (Short) as Pearl
The Great Influence (Short) as Norah
Caught in the Act (Short) as Mrs. Brown
That Crying Baby (Short)
His Aunt Emma (Short) as Pearl
Much Ado About Nothing (Short) as Pearl
Lost in the Night (Short) as Pearl Barry
Some Luck (Short)
Pleasing Her Husband (Short) as Pearl Greene
The Hand of Providence (Short) as Pearl
A News Item (Short) as Pearl
Misplaced Love (Short) as Rose
Pearl and the Poet (Short) as Pearl
The Last Gamble (Short) as Pearl Letterell
The Dress Reform (Short) as Pearl - the Wife
The Woman and the Law (Short) as Pearl
Pearl's Mistake (Short) as Pearl
Hearts Entangled (Short)
Willie's Great Scheme (Short) as Pearl
Robert's Lesson (Short) as Pearl
The Rich Uncle (Short) as Pearl
A Hidden Love (Short) as Alice
Girls Will Be Boys (Short) as Pearl
When Duty Calls (Short) as Grace
Daisy Wins (Short)
Oh! You Pearl (Short) as Pearl
Out of the Grave (Short)
Her Secretaries (Short) as Pearl
The Cabaret Singer (Short) as Madge
Hubby's New Coat (Short) as Mrs. Joyful
The Convict's Daughter (Short) as Pearl Bentley - the Convict's Daughter
A Woman' Revenge (Short)
Pearl's Hero (Short) as Pearl
First Love (Short)
The Soubrette (Short) as The Soubrette
The Heart of an Artist (Short) as Aline Morey
The Lure of the Stage (Short) as Lola - the Actress
The Kitchen Mechanic (Short) as Sal
Through Fire and Air

1914

The Lifted Veil (Short)
Shadowed (Short) as The Suspicious Wife
The Ring (Short) as Mrs. Gray
It May Come to This (Short) as Wifey
A Father's Devotion (Short)
Jones' Burglar Trap (Short) as Mrs. Jones
The Shadow of a Crime (Short) as Edith Winslow
Oh! You Puppy (Short) as Pearl
A Grateful Outcast (Short) as Pearl
What Didn't Happen to Mary? (Short) as Mary
For a Woman (Short) as Nellie
Getting Reuben Back (Short) as Annie
A Sure Cure (Short)
McSweeney's Masterpiece (Short) as Cleopatra
Lizzie and the Iceman (Short) as Lizzie
The Fat and Thin of It (Short) as Pearl - the Professor's Assistant
The Perils of Pauline (Serial)
Going Some (Short) as Pearl
The Lady Doctor (Short)
Get Out and Get Under (Short) as Pearl
A Telephone Engagement (Short) as Pearl White
The Mashers (Short)
The Dancing Craze (Short) as The Tango Instructor
Easy Money (Short) as Lizzie
The Girl in Pants (Short) as Vivian's Mother
Her New Hat (Short) as Pearl
What Pearl's Pearls Did (Short) as Pearl
Willie's Disguise (Short) as Pearl - the Schoolteacher
Was He a Hero? (Short)
East Lynne in Bugville (Short)
Liferitis (Short)
Some Collectors (Short)
Oh! You Mummy (Short) as The Mummy
The Exploits of Elaine (Serial) as Elaine Dodge

1915
Oh! You City Girl (Short)
A Lady in Distress (Short)
Sapho Up-to-Date (Short)
The New Exploits of Elaine as Elaine Dodge
The Romance of Elaine as Elaine Dodge

1916
The King's Game as Catherine Dardinilis
Hazel Kirke as Hazel Kirke
The Iron Claw (Serial) as Margery Golden
Pearl of the Army as Pearl Date

1917
Mayblossom as Anabel Lee
The Fatal Ring as Violet Standish

1918
The House of Hate as Pearl Grant (Waldon) / Jenny Acton

1919
The Lightning Raider (Serial) as The Lightning Raider
The Black Secret (Serial) as Evelyn Ereth

1920
The White Moll as Rhoda, The White Moll
The Tiger's Cub as Tiger's Cub
The Thief (Short) as Mary Vantyne

1921
The Mountain Woman as Alexander McGiverns
Know Your Men as Ellen Schuyler
Beyond Price as Sally Marrio
Annabel's Romance
A Virgin Paradise as Gratia Latham

1922
Any Wife as Myrtle (Mrs. John Hill)
The Broadway Peacock as Myrtle May
Without Fear as Ruth Hamilton

1923
Plunder (Serial) as Pearl Travers

1924
 Terror as Hélène Lorfeuil (final film role)

External links    
Pearl White filmography
The Perils of Pauline, a screen bio of Pearl White, available for free download at Internet Archive

Actress filmographies
American filmographies